Russell Downing (born 23 August 1978) is an English former professional cyclist, who rode competitively between 1999 and 2019 for numerous teams, such as  and . He is the younger brother of fellow cyclist Dean Downing, and both brothers competed largely on the UCI Continental Tour and in British Premier Calendar races.

Career
Downing was born into a bike racing family: as well as his older brother, his father was also a bicycle racer. He was also a talented football player, playing with Rotherham United F.C.'s under-16s team, but Downing was convinced to become a professional cyclist by Milk Race winner Chris Walker, who Downing trained with during his late teens.

He was the winner of the British National Road Race Championships in 2005.

In addition to his national championships, he was also successful in some multi-stage races. His biggest victories came in the 2010 Tour de Wallonie, a 2.HC class event, as well as the 2009 Tour of Ireland.

For 2010 he signed a one-year contract with the new British Professional Team, and became the first Briton to win a stage for the team, picking up a win in the Critérium International. His contract was renewed for a further year, for the 2011 season. In November 2011 it was announced that his contract was not being renewed for a third year and he would join the British Continental Team . Following the merger of Endura with Team NetApp Downing joined the  squad for 2013. In September 2013 it was announced that Russell and Dean Downing would join the new  team for 2014.

Major results

Road

1997
 2nd Road race, National Under-23 Road Championships
1998
 Tour du Maroc
1st Stages 7 & 9
1999
 3rd Road race, National Road Championships
2002
 1st Buggenhout Kermesse
 1st Boekhout Kermesse
 Tour de Brandenburge
1st  Points classification
1st Stage 1
 1st Stage 2 Circuit des Mines
 5th Archer Grand Prix
2004
 1st Overall Credit Union Ras Mumhan
1st Stages 2, 4 & 5
 1st Havant International
 1st Colne Grand Prix
 1st Warwick Town Centre Circuit Race
 1st East Yorkshire Classic
 1st Stage 4 Circuit des Mines
 1st Stage 1 Circuit des Plages Vendéennes
 8th Archer Grand Prix
2005
 1st  Road race, National Road Championships
 1st Havant International
 1st Lincoln Grand Prix
 1st Clitheroe Town Centre Grand Prix
 1st Stage 5 Giro del Capo
 2nd Overall Circuit des Plages Vendéennes
1st Stage 1
 3rd Overall Ruban Granitier Breton
1st Stages 1, 3 & 6
2006
 1st Overall Triptyque Ardennais
 1st Druivenkoers Overijse
 1st Stage 5 Tour de Beauce
 7th Omloop der Kempen
 9th Overall Tour of Britain
2007
 1st Richmond Grand Prix
 2nd Merco Credit Union Cycling Classic
 3rd Lincoln Grand Prix
2008
 1st Overall Premier Calendar
 1st Overall Girvan 3-Day
1st Stages 1 & 2
 1st Overall Tour of the Reservoir
 1st Overall Chas Messenger Stage Race
 1st Robert Price International Grand Prix of Wales
 1st Tour of Blackpool
 1st East Yorkshire Classic
 1st Richmond Grand Prix
 1st Lincoln Grand Prix
 2nd Overall Tour of Ireland
1st  Points classification
1st Stage 4
 4th Rogaland GP
 5th East Midlands International CiCLE Classic
 8th Overall Cinturón a Mallorca
1st Stages 2, 3 & 4
 10th Overall Tour of Britain
2009
 1st Overall Premier Calendar
 1st  Overall Tour of Ireland
1st  Points classification
1st Stage 1
 1st Lincoln Grand Prix
 1st Smithfield Nocturne
 1st Ryedale Grand Prix
 1st Colne Grand Prix
 1st East Yorkshire Classic Circuit Race
 2nd Beaumont Trophy
 5th Overall Tour of Britain
 5th Overall Girvan Three Day
1st Stages 3 & 4
 7th Overall Rás Tailteann
 8th East Midlands International CiCLE Classic
 9th Overall Cinturón a Mallorca
1st Stage 3
2010
 1st  Overall Tour de Wallonie
1st Stage 5
 1st Monsal Hill Climb
 1st Stage 2 Critérium International
 1st Stage 1 (TTT) Tour of Qatar
 4th Overall Tour de Picardie
2012
 1st Grand Prix de la Ville de Lillers
 1st Beaumont Trophy
 1st Eddie Soens Memorial Road Race
 1st Lincoln Grand Prix
 1st Stage 5 Tour of Norway
 2nd Overall Circuit des Ardennes
1st  Points classification
1st Stage 1
 4th Route Adélie
2013
 1st  National Criterium Championships
 3rd Monsal Hill Climb
2014
 1st Stockton Grand Prix
 3rd Ryedale Grand Prix
 3rd Circuit of the Fens
 3rd Newport Nocturne
 4th Road race, Commonwealth Games
 5th Rutland–Melton International CiCLE Classic
 10th RideLondon–Surrey Classic
2015
 4th Gran Premio della Costa Etruschi
 4th Velothon Wales
 8th Trofeo Playa de Palma
2016
 3rd Overall Tour du Loir-et-Cher
1st Stage 2
2017
 2nd Poreč Trophy
 10th Rutland–Melton CiCLE Classic

Track

1999
 National Track Championships
1st  Team pursuit
2nd Madison (with Jon Clay)
2002
 National Track Championships
1st  Scratch
3rd Points race
2003
 National Track Championships
1st  Points race
1st  Madison (with Dean Downing)
2nd Scratch
2004
 1st  Team pursuit, UCI Track World Cup, Sydney
 3rd Scratch, National Track Championships
2013
 3rd Madison, National Track Championships (with Jonathan McEvoy)
2014
 2nd Team pursuit, National Track Championships

References

External links

1978 births
Living people
Cyclists from Yorkshire
British cycling road race champions
Sportspeople from Rotherham
Commonwealth Games competitors for England
Cyclists at the 2014 Commonwealth Games